Rhondy Weston (born June 7, 1966) is a former football defensive tackle in the National Football League (NFL) for the Tampa Bay Buccaneers. He played college football at the University of Florida. The Dallas Cowboys selected him in the third round of the 1989 NFL Draft.

Early years 

Weston was born in Belle Glade, Florida. He attended Glades Central High School, where he played defensive tackle for the Glades Central Raiders. 

As a senior, he was recognized as a high school All-American. One of his teammates was future NFL player Louis Oliver.

College career 

Weston accepted a football scholarship from the University of Florida, and played for head coach Galen Hall's Florida Gators football team from 1985 to 1988. 

As a freshman, he was a backup and had 2 sacks in the third game of the season against Mississippi State University. The next year he was named the starter at right defensive tackle and posted 96 tackles, including a season-high 15 tackles against the University of Georgia.

As a junior in 1987, he was a first-team All-SEC selection and an honorable-mention All-American, after finishing the year with 54 tackles, 14 tackles for loss (second on the team) and 6 sacks (second on the team), although he played the final four games with a broken jaw he suffered in a nightclub fight. He was a part of a defense that was third in the nation in pass defense (123.6 yards per game), fourth in total defense (247.8) and recorded back-back shutouts for the first time in school history since 1956.

As a senior, Weston was part of a dominant defensive line, along with Trace Armstrong and Jeff Roth. He suffered injuries in the preseason that kept him from starting 2 of the season's first 5 games. He returned against Mississippi State University, tallying 4 tackles (2 for loss), 2 passes defensed and his only career interception. Against Memphis State University, he had a season-high 10 tackles, one sack and one forced fumble. He finished the year with 49 tackles, 15 tackles for loss (led the team), 10 sacks (led the team), 5 passes defensed, one forced fumble, was a second-team All-SEC selection and an honorable-mention All-American.

Professional career

Dallas Cowboys 

Weston was selected by the Dallas Cowboys in the third round (68th overall pick) of the 1989 NFL Draft. After having a disappointing training camp, he was waived on August 29 and replaced with defensive tackle Dean Hamel.

Tampa Bay Buccaneers 

In 1989, Weston was claimed by the Tampa Bay Buccaneers and eventually released on September 4. He was signed to the team's practice squad on September 6.  He was promoted to the active roster during the regular season and played in twelve games, with two starts, at defensive end.  He had two quarterback sacks and a fumble recovery.

Cleveland Browns 

On March 8, 1990, Weston signed with the Cleveland Browns as a free agent, but suffered a right knee injury and was placed on the injured reserve list on September 8. He never fully recovered and was waived injured on August 19, 1991.

Personal life 

Weston mother died in a car accident when he was a junior in college. He donated one of his kidneys to childhood friend Tommy Duhart, who had battled severe diabetes.

He later returned to Gainesville and completed his bachelor's degree in health and human performance, graduating from the University of Florida in 2010.

See also 

 Florida Gators football, 1980–89
 History of the Tampa Bay Buccaneers
 List of Florida Gators in the NFL Draft
 List of University of Florida alumni

References

Bibliography 

 Carlson, Norm, University of Florida Football Vault: The History of the Florida Gators, Whitman Publishing, LLC, Atlanta, Georgia (2007).  .
 Golenbock, Peter, Go Gators!  An Oral History of Florida's Pursuit of Gridiron Glory, Legends Publishing, LLC, St. Petersburg, Florida (2002).  .
 Hairston, Jack, Tales from the Gator Swamp: A Collection of the Greatest Gator Stories Ever Told, Sports Publishing, LLC, Champaign, Illinois (2002).  .
 McCarthy, Kevin M.,  Fightin' Gators: A History of University of Florida Football, Arcadia Publishing, Mount Pleasant, South Carolina (2000).  .
 Nash, Noel, ed., The Gainesville Sun Presents The Greatest Moments in Florida Gators Football, Sports Publishing, Inc., Champaign, Illinois (1998).  .

1966 births
Living people
People from Belle Glade, Florida
Sportspeople from the Miami metropolitan area
Players of American football from Florida
American football defensive ends
American football defensive tackles
Florida Gators football players
Tampa Bay Buccaneers players
Cleveland Browns players